Human Zoo is the sixth studio album released by the hard rock band Gotthard.

The album peaked at #1 on the Swiss Charts and was certified as 2× Platinum for exceeding 60,000 sales.

Track listing

Personnel
Steve Lee – vocals
Leo Leoni – guitars 
Marc Lynn — bass
Hena Habegger – drums and percussion
Mandy Meyer – guitars

Production
Mixing – Paul Lani

Charts

Weekly charts

Year-end charts

References

External links
Heavy Harmonies page

Gotthard (band) albums
2003 albums